Ditta is a genus of plants, under the family Euphorbiaceae first described as a genus in 1861. It is native to the Greater Antilles in the Caribbean.

Species
 Ditta maestrensis Borhidi - Sierra Maestra in SE Cuba
 Ditta myricoides Griseb. - Cuba, Hispaniola, Puerto Rico

References

Adenoclineae
Flora of the Caribbean
Euphorbiaceae genera